Mordella deserta is a species of beetle in the genus Mordella of the family Mordellidae. Discovered in 1885, it is a part of the superfamily Tenebrionoidea

References

Beetles described in 1885
deserta
Taxa named by Thomas Lincoln Casey Jr.